Valera is one of the twenty municipalities in the Venezuelan state of Trujillo. Its capital is the city of Valera. In the 2011 census, its population was 250,000.

The municipality contains six parishes, Juan Ignacio Montilla, La Beatriz, La Puerta, Mendoza del Valle del Momboy, Mercedes Díaz and San Luis.

References 

Municipalities of Trujillo (state)
Valera